The 1989–90 Courage League National Division Three was the third full season of rugby union within the third tier of the English league system, currently known as National League 1. Each team played one match against the other teams, playing a total of eleven matches each. Following their relegation the previous season, London Scottish won all their eleven matches and won promotion with three matches remaining, to return to National Division Two. Wakefield finished second and were also promoted. London Welsh finished in last place and was relegated to Area League South for the following season.

Participating teams and locations

League table

Sponsorship
National Division Three is part of the Courage Clubs Championship and is sponsored by Courage Brewery

See also
 English Rugby Union Leagues
 English rugby union system
 Rugby union in England

References

External links
 National Clubs Association

N3
National League 1 seasons